XV Corps was a British infantry corps during World War I.

World War I
XV Corps was formed in Egypt on 9 December 1915 and then reformed in France on 22 April 1916 under Lieutenant-General Sir Henry Horne. It took part in the Battle of the Somme in 1916.

Order of battle on 11 November 1918
Prior to the armistice, the corps halted on the Schelde on 10 November 1918. It was composed of the following units, the 36th Division having been transferred from the X Corps on 9 November 1918:
14th (Light) Division (Major General Skinner)
40th Division (Major General Peyton)
36th (Ulster) Division (Major General Coffin)
3rd Cavalry Division (Major General Harmon)
Corps Troops
V/XV Heavy Trench Mortar Battery
15th Cyclist Bn
XV Corps Signal Company

General Officers Commanding
Commanders included:
 12 January – 12 April 1916 Lieutenant-General Henry Horne
 22 April – 29 September 1916 Lieutenant-General Henry Horne
 29 September 1916 – 12 April 1918 Lieutenant-General Sir John Du Cane
 12 April – November 1918 Lieutenant-General Sir Henry de Beauvoir De Lisle

References

British field corps
Corps of the British Army in World War I